Rick Lyle (born February 26, 1971) is a former American football defensive end who played for four teams in a 9-year National Football League (NFL) career.

High school
Lyle attended Hickman Mills High School in Kansas City, Missouri, where he was All State in wrestling, finishing fifth in state his senior year. He was also the two-time State Champion in the shot put during his junior and senior years, winning by over five feet beyond his closest competitor his senior year.  He won many city, metro and state honors in football, including honorable mention USA Today All-American.

College career
Rick Lyle was named Freshman All-American at the University of Missouri his redshirt freshman season and was honorable mention all Big Eight his junior and senior years.  At his graduation, Rick held the University of Missouri career record for quarterback sacks.  Lyle was in the top five all time at MU in the five weight lifts used to judge overall strength and was the top lifter in their history at that time in the Power Clean.  He was also indoor champion in the shot put and eventually became an outdoor All-American in the shot put, and also held several University of Missouri records.  Rick will be inducted into the University of Missouri Athletic Hall of Fame in January.

NFL career
Lyle signed a free agent contract with the Cleveland Browns under Bill Belichick as head coach after graduation from Missouri.  He stayed with them through two years, although he missed the second year after a training camp injury required surgery.  He then moved with the team to Baltimore, where he played as a Raven for one year.  The next five years were with the New York Jets, under Bill Parcells and Bill Belichick and later Herman Edwards. During his time there, he started 67 consecutive regular season and playoff games, including the 1998 Jets versus Broncos American Conference Championship Game. Lyle's last two seasons in the NFL were with the New England Patriots, once again with Belichick, as he was with the Browns and the Jets. His last game was Super Bowl XXXVIII, the Patriots' win over the Carolina Panthers.

NFL statistics

Post NFL life
After his retirement from the NFL, Lyle and his family moved to the St. Louis area where he worked as an assistant coach at Marquette High School, a local high school.  In 2006, Eric Mangini asked Rick to join his new staff when he became head coach of the New York Jets.  Lyle serves as an assistant strength and conditioning coach and is responsible as well to see that the team's food, both at their facilities and on the road, is prepared and served properly, and especially, safely.

Rick is married to the former Laura Horstmeyer and has two daughters, Haley and Audrey.  He and his family are currently living near the Jets' facilities in New Jersey. They will move to Ohio to work for the Browns once again in June 2009.

References

1971 births
Living people
Sportspeople from Monroe, Louisiana
Players of American football from Louisiana
American football defensive ends
Missouri Tigers football players
Cleveland Browns players
Baltimore Ravens players
New York Jets players
New England Patriots players
New York Jets coaches